The 207th Street station is a local station on the IRT Broadway–Seventh Avenue Line of the New York City Subway. Located at the intersection of 207th Street and 10th Avenue in the Manhattan neighborhood of Inwood, it is served by the 1 train at all times.

History 

This station was completed in 1906, but since it was in a sparsely populated location, it did not open until April 1, 1907.

To address overcrowding, in 1909, the New York Public Service Commission proposed lengthening platforms at stations along the original IRT subway. As part of a modification to the IRT's construction contracts, made on January 18, 1910, the company was to lengthen station platforms to accommodate ten-car express and six-car local trains. In addition to $1.5 million (equivalent to $ million in ) spent on platform lengthening, $500,000 was spent on building additional entrances and exits. It was anticipated that these improvements would increase capacity by 25 percent. The northbound platform at the 207th Street station was extended  to the north. The southbound platform was not lengthened. Six-car local trains began operating in October 1910, and ten-car express trains began running on the West Side Line on January 24, 1911. Subsequently, the station could accommodate six-car local trains, but ten-car trains could not open some of their doors.

A subway crash occurred at the station in 1916, in which one train telescoped into another train. One motorman was badly injured, and twelve of the more than 200 passengers on the trains suffered minor injuries.

The city government took over the IRT's operations on June 12, 1940. A contract for the platform extensions at 207th Street and five other stations on the line was awarded to the Rao Electrical Equipment Company and the Kaplan Electric Company in June 1946. The platform extensions at these stations were opened in stages. On July 9, 1948, the platform extensions at stations between 207th Street and 238th Street were opened for use at the cost of $423,000. At the same time, the IRT routes were given numbered designations with the introduction of "R-type" rolling stock, which contained rollsigns with numbered designations for each service. The route to 242nd Street became known as the 1.

From January 5 to December 20, 2019, a free out-of-system transfer was provided from this station to Inwood–207th Street to accommodate the temporary closure of the IRT platforms at 168th Street, where a free transfer was normally provided. A similar transfer was also provided one station north at 215th Street.

Station layout

This elevated station has two side platforms and three tracks, with the center track not used in revenue service. Both platforms have beige windscreens and dark canopies (both of which are currently being replaced as part of a renovation project) in the center, and black steel waist-high fences at either end. The station name plates are in the standard black with white lettering.

North of this station, there are two switches and a ramp to allow access from each of the three tracks to the 207th Street Yard, which runs along the east side of the line.

The 1991 artwork here is called Elevated Nature I-IV by Wopo Holup. It consists of two concrete panels with wooden frames on the southbound platform's station house. Each panel consists of eight squares depicting tree limbs. Similar artwork is also located at four other stations on this line.

Exits
Both platforms have one wooden adjacent station house in the center. However, only the southbound one is used for passenger service. Doors from the platform lead to a small waiting area, where a turnstile bank provides entrance/exit from the station. Outside the fare control area, there is a token booth, one staircase going down to the southwest corner of 207th Street and Tenth Avenue, and a passageway leading to a staircase that goes down to the northwest corner.

The station house on the northbound platform is used for employees only. One exit-only turnstile at platform level leads to a staircase that goes down to the northeast corner of 207th Street and Tenth Avenue, while a High Entry/Exit Turnstile, also at platform level, leads to a staircase going down to the southeast corner.

References

External links 

 
 Station Reporter – 1 Train
 The Subway Nut – 207th Street Pictures 
 207th Street entrance from Google Maps Street View
 Platforms from Google Maps Street View

IRT Broadway–Seventh Avenue Line stations
New York City Subway stations in Manhattan
Railway stations in the United States opened in 1907
1907 establishments in New York City